A. C. Murali Mohan (1960-25 June 2014) was an Indian actor who appeared in Tamil-and other language serials . He acted in movies as well as appearing for several advertisements. He is notable  for a popular commercial for Horlicks and was popularly called Horlicks Mama and also for his role as  Laxman in the Popular serial Thendral.

In the early 1990s he started in a character and comedy based roles in Tamil films. He has acted in several serials and appeared in several advertisements.

Partial filmography

Television

Death
He committed suicide by hanging himself from the roof on the night of 25 June 2014. He is survived by his wife Seetha Rani, and son Uma Shankar.

References

1960 births
2014 deaths
Male actors in Tamil cinema
Place of birth missing
Suicides by hanging in India